The title "Surf City, USA" was the subject of a trademark dispute between the California coastal cities of Huntington Beach and Santa Cruz. Both cities historically claimed the "Surf City" moniker, but the dispute intensified in 2004 after the Huntington Beach Conference and Visitors Bureau successfully filed the "Surf City USA" trademark with the U.S. Patent and Trademark Office.  A settlement was eventually reached in January 2008, which allows Huntington Beach to retain the trademark.

Background
The cities of Huntington Beach and Santa Cruz both claim to be "Surf City", based on their respective surfing culture. Santa Cruz was the site of first recorded surfing in California, by Hawaiians. It is also home to the Santa Cruz Surfing Museum, 11 world-class surf breaks such as Steamer Lane which create some of the best surfing waves in the world, and the site of the O'Neill Cold Water Classic and other international surfing contests. Meanwhile, Huntington Beach is the home of the U.S. Open of Surfing and the International Surfing Museum. In addition, the rock and roll duo Jan and Dean had Huntington Beach, not Santa Cruz, in mind when they recorded their 1960s song "Surf City".

Santa Cruz began using the "Surf City" nickname in 1927 after a local newspaper coined the moniker. Huntington Beach officially adopted the "Surf City USA" nickname in 1991.

Registration of the trademark
The Huntington Beach Conference and Visitors Bureau filed several applications to register the "Surf City USA" trademark in November 2004. The idea was to market the city by creating an authentic brand based on Southern California's beach culture and active outdoor lifestyle while at the same time creating a family of product licensees who operate like a franchise family producing a revenue stream that could also be dedicated to promoting the brand and city. A ruling by the U.S. Patent and Trademark Office, released on May 12, 2006, awarded the first three trademark registrations to the Bureau.

One of the first products the Bureau developed to promote its brand was the Surf City USA Beach Cruiser by Felt Bicycles. The Bureau now has dozens of other licensed products on the market from Surf City USA soft drinks to clothing to glassware; and more than 20 licensing partners with over 50 different products.

Response and settlement
After Huntington Beach trademarked the "Surf City USA" name, Santa Cruz politicians tried to prevent the trademark from being registered by the U.S. Patent and Trademark Office because of the controversy over the "Surf City" nickname. Nevertheless, a law firm representing Huntington Beach sent cease-and-desist letters to Santa Cruz vendors to stop selling T-shirts emblazoned with "Surf City USA"."

In response, two Santa Cruz surf shops, Shoreline Surf Shop and Noland's on the Wharf, sued Huntington Beach in order to protect the public use of the term "Surf City." The parties then reached a confidential settlement in January 2008, in which neither side admitted liability and all claims and counterclaims were dismissed. The Santa Cruz surf shops continue to print T-shirts, and the Visitor's Bureau retains the right to use the trademark.

Aftermath
In 2009 Steve Marble, of Los Angeles Times' "L.A. Now" news blog, wrote an article The real Surf City? It's Santa Cruz, says magazine saying: "But Surfer magazine proclaims Santa Cruz to be 'The Real Surf City, USA,' after it considered the surf, food and vibe of the nations' best known surf towns."  Steve Marble quotes Surfer: "Huntington Beach may have won the right to the name ‘Surf City, USA’ in the California courts, but any surfer who's ever paddled out at Steamer Lane knows the judge got it wrong.”

References

California culture
Huntington Beach, California
Santa Cruz, California